Same-sex marriage is performed and recognized in all municipalities of the state of Quintana Roo. The first two same-sex marriages occurred in Kantunilkin on 28 November 2011 after it was discovered that the state's Civil Code does not specify sex or gender requirements for marriage. However, future same-sex marriages were suspended in January 2012 upon review by the state's Secretary General of Government. The two same-sex marriages in the state were annulled by the Governor of Quintana Roo, Roberto Borge Angulo, in April 2012, but these annulments were reversed by the Secretary General of Government on 3 May. The Secretary's decision allows for future same-sex marriages to be performed in Quintana Roo.

Quintana Roo was the first Mexican state, and the second jurisdiction in Mexico after Mexico City, to legalize same-sex marriage. Further legislation and rulings from the Supreme Court of Justice of the Nation that same-sex marriage bans violate the Constitution of Mexico have expanded same-sex marriage to every state.

Legal history

The Civil Code of Quintana Roo does not define gender requirements for marriage, specifying only "people interested in getting married". A same-sex couple, Patricia Novelo and Areli Castro, applied for a marriage license in Cancún and Chetumal after discovering this legal quirk, but both cities rejected their applications, arguing that a heterosexual marriage was implied. The couple then applied in Lázaro Cárdenas Municipality, where authorities accepted the application. Quintana Roo's first two same-sex marriages were held in the community of Kantunilkín on 28 November 2011.

Cancún and other resort areas in Quintana Roo planned to hold a same-sex group wedding in January 2012. Newspaper Reforma reported that upcoming ceremonies were suspended following an order by the Quintana Roo Secretary General of Government, Luis González Flores, to review the legality of the ceremonies. In April 2012, both marriages were annulled by Roberto Borge Angulo, the Governor of Quintana Roo. In May 2012, the Secretary General of Government reversed the annulments. The next month, both marriages became legal because there was no estoppel in due time. González Flores announced that same-sex marriages are legal in all the municipalities of Quintana Roo. However, in 2013, a lesbian couple were denied the right to marry and forced to obtain an amparo in Tulum. The court concluded that discriminatory acts had occurred and ordered the state to prevent further discrimination against same-sex couples, requiring all civil registry offices in Quintana Roo to process marriage applications from same-sex couples.

In September 2014, Bacalar Municipality approved changes to equalize procedures for all marriages. Officials in Playa del Carmen announced that same-sex couples could begin marrying in the municipality from the last week of September 2014. The municipality of Othón P. Blanco announced that their first same-sex marriage would occur on 26 November 2014, and the municipality of José María Morelos announced in 2017 that it had equalized procedures for all marriages. Marriage services are also available in Yucatec Maya.

Legislative action
In November 2014, it was announced that a bill to officially legalize same-sex marriage in the state would be introduced and voted on in the current legislative session, thereby replacing the loophole used by couples. In May 2017, after legislative inaction, another same-sex marriage bill was introduced to the Congress of Quintana Roo.

Adoption by same-sex couples
In January 2018, a married same-sex couple in Puerto Morelos were granted the right to register their child. In April 2018, with the help of the State Human Rights Commission, a same-sex couple in the city of Cancún were also allowed to register their newborn son.

According to 2021 statistics from the civil registry, there are about 30 to 40 cases of lesbian couples registering their children in the state every year.

Marriage statistics
As of mid-December 2014, officials announced that there had been 14 same-sex marriages in Quintana Roo.

The National Institute of Statistics and Geography announced that there had been 163 same-sex marriages in 2018, of which 96 (59%) had been between lesbian couples and 67 (41%) between male couples. According to data from the civil registry, most same-sex marriages in 2018 took place in the northern region, particularly in the municipalities of Benito Juárez, Solidaridad, Cozumel, Puerto Morelos, Isla Mujeres and Tulum, but also Bacalar in the south. From January to August 2018, only 3 same-sex marriages were performed in Othón P. Blanco Municipality, and one same-sex couple married in José María Morelos Municipality in that same time period.

277 same-sex marriages were performed in 2019, of which 139 were between two men and 138 between two women. In 2020, 210 same-sex marriages were performed in Quintana Roo; 107 between two men and 103 between two women.

Public opinion
A 2017 opinion poll conducted by  found that 56% of Quintana Roo residents supported same-sex marriage, while 37.5% were opposed.

According to a 2018 survey by the National Institute of Statistics and Geography, 38% of the Quintana Roo public opposed same-sex marriage.

See also

 LGBT rights in Mexico
 Same-sex marriage in Mexico

Notes

References

Quintana Roo
Quintana Roo
2012 in LGBT history